Human Harbour is the fifth studio album by Swedish band Melody Club released on March 2, 2011.

Track listing
 The Hunter
 Dreamers Wasteland
 Sweet Disaster
 A New Set of Wings
 Only You Can Heal Me
 War of Hearts
 Human Harvest
 Bed of Needles
 Karma Control
 I Don't Believe in Angels
 You Don't Love Me

Chart positions

References

2011 albums
Melody Club albums